Newell Hall is a historic site in Gainesville, Florida, United States. It is located in the northeastern section of the University of Florida. On June 27, 1979, it was added to the U.S. National Register of Historic Places. Formerly home to the Department of Soil and Water Science, the building is currently used as a 24/7 study space for university students to collaborate.

Namesake

Newell Hall is named for Wilmon Newell, the Provost of Agriculture at the University of Florida from 1921 until his death in October 1943.

Renovations 
On April 17, 2017, a newly renovated and expanded Newell Hall opened on campus. The $16.6 million project added expansive indoor seating, an Au Bon Pain restaurant, as well as numerous modern study spaces and meeting rooms. Outdoor hammocks were installed and new landscaping was added.

See also
University of Florida
Buildings at the University of Florida
Campus Historic District

References

External links 
 Alachua County listings at National Register of Historic Places
 Alachua County listings at Florida's Office of Cultural and Historical Programs
 Virtual tour of University of Florida Campus Historic District at Alachua County's Department of Growth Management
 The University of Florida Historic Campus at UF Facilities Planning & Construction
 George A. Smathers Libraries
 UF Builds: The Architecture of the University of Florida
 Newell Hall

National Register of Historic Places in Gainesville, Florida
Buildings at the University of Florida
William Augustus Edwards buildings
University and college buildings on the National Register of Historic Places in Florida
1910 establishments in Florida
University and college buildings completed in 1910